Khethamabala Petros Sithole is a South African member of the National Assembly of South Africa from the Inkatha Freedom Party. He was first elected at the 2009 South African general election.

References 

Living people
Members of the National Assembly of South Africa
Inkatha Freedom Party politicians
21st-century South African politicians
Year of birth missing (living people)